In probability theory, Popoviciu's inequality, named after Tiberiu Popoviciu, is an upper bound on the variance σ2 of any bounded probability distribution.  Let M and m be upper and lower bounds on the values of any random variable with a particular probability distribution.  Then Popoviciu's inequality states:

 

This equality holds precisely when half of the probability is concentrated at each of the two bounds.

Sharma et al. have sharpened Popoviciu's inequality:

 

Popoviciu's inequality is weaker than the Bhatia–Davis inequality which states

 

where μ is the expectation of the random variable.

In the case of an independent sample of n observations from a bounded probability distribution, the von Szokefalvi Nagy inequality gives a lower bound to the variance of the sample mean:

Proof via the Bhatia–Davis inequality
Then, since , 

.

Thus, 

.

.

References

Theory of probability distributions
Statistical inequalities
Statistical deviation and dispersion